URBNET Records is an independent record label based in Toronto, Ontario, Canada.  URBNET was formed by Darryl Rodway and Janusz Jarosinski in 1999 to provide distribution, marketing and promotional services to Hip Hop artists throughout Canada. URBNET was distributed by EMI Music Canada from 2002–2003, Outside Music from 2003–2006 and is distributed in Canada by Fontana Distribution (North), a subsidiary of Universal Music Canada.

Artists

 The Carps
 Dan-e-o
 D-Sisive
 Dirty Circus
 DL Incognito
 Grand Analog
 Kae Sun
 Korea Town Acid
 Moka Only
 Mood Ruff
 Pigeon Hole
 Red Ants
 Sweatshop Union
 Soviets (Jeff Spec & Chaix)
 Trillionaire$
 Tru-Paz
 Wordburglar
 Career Crooks (Zilla Rocca & Small Professor)

See also

 List of record labels
 Underground hip hop

References

External links
Official website
URBNET at Bandcamp
URBNET a t Discogs

Record labels established in 1999
Canadian independent record labels
Canadian hip hop record labels
Companies based in Toronto
1999 establishments in Ontario